The Doncaster Metropolitan Borough Council elections took place on 4 May 2006. One third of the council was up for election, with the council remaining in no overall control. The Labour Party remained the largest party on the council, picking up two seats overall.

Election results

Ward results

Adwick

Armthorpe

Askern Spa

Balby

Bentley

Bessacarr and Cantley

Central

Conisbrough and Denaby

Edenthorpe, Kirk Sandall and Barnby Dun

Edlington and Warmsworth

Finningley

Great North Road

Hatfield

Mexborough

Rossington

Sprotbrough

Stainforth and Moorends

Thorne

Torne Valley

Town Moor

Wheatley

References

2006
Doncaster